Kingdom of David: The Saga of the Israelites was a part of the Empire Series of history documentaries  for the Public Broadcasting Service (PBS) Public television stations produced by Oregon Public Broadcasting (OPB) in joint venture with Red Hill Productions of Los Angeles, California.

The documentary chronicles the  story of how the Jewish people were able to preserve their culture from being overwhelmed by other more powerful worldly kingdoms. It begins with the Babylonian Exile where the Judean scribes, realizing that they faced the same fate as their ten northern brothers of the lost Kingdom of Israel, fought to preserve their identity and culture though the written word.  From there it describes the struggles that the Jewish people faced against the materialism of the Seleucid Empire to the armed might makes right attitude of the Roman Empire. The story culminates with the triumph of individual Jewish sages such as Hillel, Yochanan ben Zakai, and Rabbi Akiva in preserving Jewish tradition that has survived to this day.

First aired in 2003 as a series of four 55 minute programs, the series is now available in DVD and VHS video tapes.

The 220 minute video presentation is broken down into 4 parts which, in turn, are subdivided into scene selections that are accessible in the Main Menu portion of the DVD.

By the Rivers of Babylon

The Hebrew Bible

In 589 B.C. the Babylonian king Nebuchadnezzar attacked and destroyed Jerusalem, the main city of the Judean kingdom.  After its fall, the citizens were taken into exile in Babylonia.  Only a few generations earlier their 10 northern cousins in the Kingdom of Israel had suffered a similar fate and had vanished forever as they had been integrated into the neighboring societies found throughout the region.

In order to fight for their survival as a people, the Judeans decided to write a book instead of taking up armed struggle.  They rewrote and edited together stories of their past and assembled them into what we today know as the Hebrew Bible, or Old Testament. It then states that it was written to teach the exiled the reasons why they were in Babylon as well as being a guide as to how they should live their lives.

Abraham

Abraham was born in the city of Ur in Mesopotamia.  The documentary briefly recounts the stories of Abraham believing in one god and the ultimate test that God gave him to sacrifice his son.  Such stories, whether true or not, represent the turning away from idolatry.  As a result, Abraham is considered the founding figure of Christianity, Islam and Judaism.

For the scribes in Babylon, simply writing down stories of their ancestors was not enough.  Their great challenge was to make sense of their own world.  How did such a promised people of God end up near extinction in Babylon?  In paganism, if you are defeated it was because someone else's god was more powerful than yours.  But, with monotheism, if someone is suffering, then the individual must have done something wrong.  This new book describes to the Judeans what they did to lose God's favor.

Moses

The documentary recounts Moses's encounter with the flaming bush and his involvement with the freeing of the Israelites from Egyptian bondage.  the Exodus is where the great epic of Israel starts.  According to William G. Dever, archeologist, the desert can only support a few thousand nomads, not the purported 3-million that legend tells us accompanied Moses.  Furthermore, only 1 or 2 sites mentioned in Exodus have been identified.  For the scribes to write an accurate historical account of what occurred 700 years earlier was improbable.  What was probable was bringing to text the eternal lessons that the story of Moses taught.

The Ten Commandments

To the scribes, the most important truths of all were how God gave Moses the laws that the people were to preserve for all time. God gave them to Moses in a face-to-face meeting.  The revolution in the Ten Commandments was that God cared about how human beings treated each other.  One honors God by treating well the person standing in front of him.  The commandments were viewed as a legal contract where God will bless an individual if the individual would follow His rules.  After Sinai, all the stories of the Israelites would be whether or not they had obeyed God's commandments.

Canaan

Archeologist feel, through the study of pottery fragments, that the Israelites did not invade Canaan, but were really Canaanites themselves.  They were the lower classes within Canaanite society that inhabited the countryside.  As they told their stories over and over, those stories helped shape a culture.  After they became a people, they continued telling the stories about the good and evil in every human heart.

Book of Deuteronomy

By 620 BC, according to the documentary, most Israelites living in Judea were rural folk that had little contact with Jerusalem and its religious rituals.  Furthermore, it's evident that they worshiped other gods, such as the goddess Asherah, besides the One True God.  King Josiah, feeling such practices by his subjects were dooming his country to foreign conquest, rallied the people around a book that had just been discovered while renovating the temple - Deuteronomy.  Most modern scholars feel the book had recently been written and then planted in the temple to be discovered in order to motivate a reformation.  The main reform was that God could only be worshiped at one spot only - the Temple in Jerusalem.  As a result, many other religious altars were burned and destroyed along with their attendants.  Scholars feel that the beginnings of monotheism by the people as a whole occurred at this time.

Jeremiah and the Babylonian Exile

Feeling that God was on his side, King Josiah launched an attack on the Egyptian/Assyrian alliance in 609 BC.  When Josiah was killed, his successors reinstituted polytheism.  Jeremiah tried to warn the people of their grave mistake to no avail.  Nebuchadnezzar's ease at conquering and destroying Jerusalem in 597 BC was proof of God's curse on David and his heirs.

Judean society would have ceased if not for the scribes putting in writing all the legends of the people.  The writings told them the reason for their exile.  The message told them that God is fair and if they were being punished there was a reason for it.  The message also stipulated that for those who accept their guilt and change their ways, there's hope.

The Book and the Sword

Temple of Yahweh
In 538 BC, the Persians conquered Babylon and King Cyrus freed all of the Babylonian's captives.  Not only were the Judeans allowed to return to their ancestral land, but they were given permission to rebuild their temple in Jerusalem.

Many Judeans, however, had found a successful life in their new surroundings and only the adventurous and deeply devout returned.  When they did so, they faced a daunting challenge.  It had been 70 years since their departure and the land was inhabited by many other groups of people who viewed the returnees as rivals for control of the land.  Added to that was the fact that the city of Jerusalem itself was a wasteland that had not been rebuilt.  After an initial jubilation, the returnees soon became apathetic and construction of the new temple came to a grinding halt.  Law and order was breaking down and eighty years after they had arrived, the return home of the exiles seemed like a horrible mistake.

Ezra and the Torah

Seeing anarchy breaking out in Judea, Persian King Artaxerxes sent Ezra to restore order.  Ezra, a scribe and priest, brought with him a completed book of rules for the people in Jerusalem to live by - the Torah (or first five book of the Old Testament).  Most of the returnees knew little of this book or its laws as it was a work in progress when they had first left Babylon.  After gathering all the returnees in a public square, Ezra read aloud the entire contents of this new book and required the listeners to sign a covenant indicating that they would abide by its rules.

This was considered a democratic revolution as there was no longer any secret knowledge confined to a priesthood class.  Everyone could now know what the priests knew.  The people and city of Jerusalem were revitalized.  The temple was completed and became the central focus of Jewish life.  A yearly pilgrimage to the temple to offer a sacrifice became of paramount importance.  (Later, when a monetary system replaced the barter system, a farmer from the countryside would sell his best animal, then travel to Jerusalem to purchase another for sacrifice at the temple).

One of the more controversial laws that Ezra had to impose on his subjects was the concept of marrying within the religion so as to keep it pure and uncorrupted.  He had the unpleasant task of ordering many unorthodox marriages to be dissolved.  Naturally, this led to discord among his subjects and the contents of the Torah pertaining to this topic were fiercely debated in public.

The Book of Job

Soon after their return to Jerusalem, a new story appeared that questioned Jews’ traditional views. The Book of Job told of a righteous man beset by catastrophe and affliction. Job's plight challenged the Hebrews’ notion of a God who consistently rewarded the righteous and punished the wicked – a central idea of biblical history. Job moans, “I helped the good, but got only wrong. I hoped for light, and got only darkness.” His suffering poses one of life's great questions and a critical challenge to Jews: If God does not reward obedience and punish sin, why bother obeying God's law at all?

The Greeks

In the early 4th century BC, Alexander the Great invaded the Mid East and brought Greek culture with him with its emphasis on mind and body.  This new culture proved to be the biggest threat to the Jewish way of life.  A new economic system based on monetary exchange replaced the barter system allowing people the freedom to move about the empire.  Soon there began a migration from the small villages to larger urban areas.  New opportunities arose for the Jewish farmer who could now sell his products in distant markets.  Jewish communities were established in other parts of the empire while Greek settlements became common in the Jewish region.

Some conservative Jewish leaders became alarmed that their traditions and ideologies were being buried under this pervasive materialistic culture.

Ben Sira: Lover of Wisdom

Ben Sira was deeply influenced by Socrates and Greek philosophy and applied the Greek tradition of study and debate to the Bible.  Ezra had given the people the Torah with its laws to live by.  Ben Sira gave the people, who were eager to look for alternatives to Greek culture, the concept of studying the lives of the Bible's heroes and to search its pages for Divine wisdom that the stories revealed.

Open to Interpretation

The Bible contains many passages that are ambiguous and seemingly contradictory and, as a result, new beliefs arose.  One of those beliefs was the concept of an afterlife where rewards and punishments were mete out.  Another belief was that the Bible was inspired by God which gave rise to the concept that reading it could prophecy future events.  The most pronounced prophecy was that a time of turmoil was coming where God would stand by those that kept their covenants with Him.

Antiochus, the Madman

The Seleucid Empire succeeded Alexander upon his death in the early 4th century BC.  At first, the Seleucid emperors were content to have Greek culture slowly influence Jewish customs.  But, in 185 BC Antiochus IV, derisively labeled the madman in Judea, had a different idea when he decreed that all of his subjects were to follow one common religion in order to unify the empire.  That religion was not monotheism.

Antiochus was able to buy off Jason, the high priest at the Jerusalem Temple.  Soon, Jason and other priests began to revoke one of the most visible symbols of the Jewish covenant with God - circumcision.  The Greeks loved athletic contests where the athletes participated in the nude.  So as to not look out of place, these priests and other Jewish males had cosmetic surgery performed to obliterate this most pronounced symbol of the covenant.

Naturally, many other Jewish leaders took offense at this latest turn of events.  It was bad enough that Greek culture worshiped more than one god, but the concept of worshiping the human body above all else was bringing Judea to the breaking point.

The Maccabees

The final profanity occurred when Antiochus IV ordered that the temple in Jerusalem be transformed into a Greek temple.  An uprising started in the rural town of Modi'in.  A priest named Mattathias refused to pay homage to a statue of Zeus and took out his anger by killing some of the emperor's emissaries.  After fleeing to the countryside, he was able to gather many other supporters to start a major war.  When confronted with the prospect of having to break the commandment banning warfare on the Sabbath day, Matathias and 1,000 of his allies chose to stay true to the word and paid the ultimate sacrifice.

After their martyrdom, Mataithias's son, Judah, and the other rebels realized that the faith could easily be annihilated if they continued to adhere to that principle. After debating the issue, they came to the conclusion that only offensive Sabbath day warfare was banned and that it was perfectly permissible to conduct defensive operations on that particular day.  Judah's brilliant military campaigns over a 3-year period of time soon earned him the nickname of Maccabee (hammer) and by 164 BC the Seleucid forces were routed from the country.

Hanukkah

After the Maccabean victory, attention was turned towards cleansing the temple and building a new altar.  Unfortunately for Judah, the Seleucid forces regrouped and defeated him, mortally wounding him in the process.  After Judah's death, his brother Jonathan took over.

By 152 BC the Seleucid Empire was undergoing internal strife between two rivals to the throne.  Jonathan offered his 10,000 strong army to the weaker of the two contenders in exchange for Judean autonomy.  His gamble paid off, Judea regained is sovereignty and Jonathan became the head priest of the Jerusalem temple.

The victory convinced the Judeans of the Bible's prophecy that God would come to the aid of those who were zealous for the law of God. That conviction would grow in the years ahead and set the stage for a true cataclysm when another great empire arrived in the Middle East - Rome.

The End of Days

Roman Rule

In 63 BC, Roman General Pompey ended Judea's 100 years of independence when he marched through the county.  He was amazed to find that the defenders of the city retreated not to a fortress, but to their holy sanctuary, the Temple.  He was equally amazed when they refused to interrupt their religious observances to offer resistance when he entered their Temple.

To Rome, Judea was but a small piece on the road to a larger prize, easy access to bountiful Egypt.  To the Jews, Judea was the Promised Land given to them by God to own.

Even worse for the Jews was that it pitted one Jew against the other - should they revolt or not.  Soon their spiritual debates broke out into physical animosity between the various groups.

On one side were the Temple High Priests and their allies, who formed the most wealthy class within Judaism. The Temple to them was the political and economic heart of Jerusalem.  Each year pilgrims flooded its markets to find food and lodging.  They spent freely to buy the very best sacrificial animals as animal sacrifices was their only permitted way of worshiping God.  Since the High Priests were the only ones allowed to mediate between the average Jew and God, they had an enormous economic stake in maintaining social order through the status quo of Roman rule.

Civil War

Other groups within Judaism felt that the High Priests were traitors.  They believed that if they waged a just war against their occupiers, as related in Biblical stories, they would have God's protection.

To help them rule Judea, the Romans chose a Jewish prince named Herod, of Idumean ancestry, who was known for his boundless ambition and extreme cruelty.  To many Jews, crowning a king not descended from David was blasphemous.  Herod and Rome felt it necessary to launch a series of unmerciful attacks against the various antagonistic Jewish groups to make an example of them so that law and order could be maintained.

To counteract his reputation for cruelty, Herod commissioned an extensive renovation of the Temple.  Soon, even Gentiles were making pilgrimages to Jerusalem to see this marvel of the ancient world and make sacrifices.  But the rebels within the Jewish community were not impressed.

The Essenes

The Essenes did not believe Jews should fight the Romans.  Their belief was that God had allowed a Roman occupation because the Biblical prophecy of the End of Days was at hand.  Their solution was to withdraw from civilization and to live as perfect a life as possible by forsaking worldly possessions and sexual relations. They spent most of their time copying religious texts and hiding them in caves near Qumran.  Their legacy is the Dead Sea scrolls.

When Herod died in 4 BC, chaos erupted as rebels attacked the traitorous upper class Jews.  To the Romans, they were brigands, but to many Jews they were seen as Robin Hoods.  Their aim of ending Roman rule was misguided as all they accomplished was social anarchy.

Hillel

Hillel and the Pharisees believed whoever was the worldly master of Judea did not matter.  What mattered was how one lived their life according to their covenant with God.  Furthermore, they did not believe one had to be a member of the priesthood to communicate with God, just study His word in the Bible.

When challenged to sum the Torah up "while standing on one foot", Hillel replied “What is hateful to you, do not do to your friend.  The rest is the explanation; go and learn.”

Jesus of Nazareth

Jesus, who was influenced by Hillel according to the documentary, went a few steps further by preaching “turn the other cheek” and to make the world a better place. He also was influenced by the Biblical End of Days prophecies.

To Rome He was just one more rabble rousing messiah.  To His followers, His talk of a Heavenly Kingdom was a reference to an afterlife and was not a part of this world.

The Zealots

In 52 AD a new group of zealots, the Sicarii, began committing political assassinations.  Anyone who collaborated with the Roman authorities was worthy of death.

The people of Jerusalem were deeply divided until the Roman governor attacked the Temple in 67 AD.  It was a miscalculated move as all Judeans within Jerusalem united and forced the Roman garrison to flee the city.

A disciple of Hillel, Yochanan ben Zakai, was one of the most passionate voices for peace.  He preached that it did not matter who ruled Judea, what mattered was who ruled an individual's heart.

But many Jews were not ready to make peace with a foreign occupier.  Giddy over their success at evicting the Roman garrison, the Zealots openly declared war on Rome.  Convinced that they were mad, other groups decided to physically challenge them.  House-to-house combat that lasted a week resulted in the city of Jerusalem being severely damaged by fire and looting.  The conflict quickly spread throughout Judea. Romans, Greeks and Syrians attacked the Jews, the Jews made reprisals against them as well as each other.  Anarchy had replaced social order.

The Siege of Jerusalem

Rome had to act and General Vespasian was dispatched with three legions of 60,000 soldiers to the troubled area.  The Jewish countryside fled to the walls of Jerusalem upon seeing the advancing Roman army.  The historian Josephus estimated that 100,000 were trapped inside the city walls where anarchy reigned.  Six rebel groups vied with one another, destroying their entire food supply.  The zealots threatened death to anyone who wished to leave the city.  If one did manage to escape, they faced the Roman army and their mercenaries who would either eviscerate them, looking for swallowed gold or jewels, or crucify them.  The hills around Jerusalem were deforested due to the number of crosses being erected for crucifixion.

Only the bodies of the dead were allowed by the Zealots to leave the city.  Feigning death, Jochanan ben Zakai, with help from his disciples, was able to escape the city lying on a cart amongst a pile of rotting meat.

Destruction of the Temple

In 70 AD, after a four-month siege, the Romans broke through the city walls.  After heavy house-to-house combat, the Roman army surrounded the Temple and destroyed it.

According to Rabbi Perry Netter, “The Temple was the center of economic life of the Jewish people.  It’s as if the Federal Reserve was housed in the Temple.  It was the center of the judicial life, the Supreme Court was housed in the temple.  It was the center of the religious life as if the high priest was the chief rabbi centered in that building.”

When the temple was destroyed, there was no other branch of government left for the Jews.  Without the temple, their future looked bleak indeed.

The Gifts of the Jews

Masada

Masada, an impregnable fortress built by Herod, atop a butte overlooking the Dead Sea, became a place of refuge that the Sachari fled to after the fall of Jerusalem in 70 AD.  There's but one narrow trail, called the Snake, leading to the top of the butte and a small garrison can defend the fortress from a much larger army.

The Romans laid siege to the fortress over a two-year period of time.  Instead of trying to navigate the treacherous trail, they put their engineering expertise to work and built a massive ramp.  The day before they were to breach the walls, Elazar ben Ya'ir, the Sachari leader, urged all his followers to commit suicide.

The Rabbis and the Synagogue

Judea was fast becoming a wasteland.  All the Sachari and Essenes were dead and, with no temple, the priesthood was now meaningless. Only one group remained in the Holy Land, the Pharisees.  Yochanan ben Zakai, their leader, set up his headquarters and a biblical school in the town of Yavne.  In this school Yochanan and his followers slowly rebuilt Judaism from the ashes of the destroyed temple.

His first act was to transformed the synagogue, long a meeting place within the Jewish community to discuss daily living along with religious matters, into a more formal place which now focused exclusively on honoring God.  He also revived, or reinforced, a seldom used practice favored by the writer of Psalms - prayer.  Perhaps his greatest accomplishment was his teaching the concept that one can come closer to God through acts of loving kindness and by studying the Hebrew Bible or Torah.

Seder

One of the major feasts at the temple was Passover where the participants celebrated their liberation from the Egyptians with an elaborate ceremony.  With the temple gone, a new kind of celebration had to be devised - the Seder.  Instead of being a mass celebration, it was now done in the home with family and friends.

Bar Kockba Rebellion

During the 60 years since the temple's destruction, an uneasy truce existed between the Jews and the Romans.  In 130 AD, a petition to Emperor Hadrian to rebuild the temple had been refused.  With tempers rising, Rome next tried to either establish a pagan city, Aelia Capitolina, on the ashes of Jerusalem, or issue a decree forbidding circumcision.  Whichever one it was, it turned out to be the catalyst that launched a new rebellion within Judea.

Simon Bar Kockba began secretly plotting a guerilla style insurrection.  Many Judeans either thought Bar Kockba to be the Messiah or that the Messiah would come forth if they were victorious.  Along with the Messiah, a third temple would descend from the sky and settle on top of the previous one.  In 132 AD the rebels ranks swelled when the most prominent rabbi declared Bar Kockba to indeed be the Messiah.

The Bar Kockba rebels bided their time until Emperor Hadrian had left the area for a return trip to Rome.  Once he was far enough away, the rebellion was launched and they succeeded in having the Romans withdraw from the area.

Julius Severus and Exile

Emperor Hadrian could ill afford to have Judea break away and set an example for other rebellious regions within the empire.  He commissioned Julius Severus to settle the Judean problem once and for all and sent 13 legions to the area, with units coming from as far as the Rhine and Britain.  In all, about 600,000 Jews were slaughtered and the remnants were forced to leave the land.  In the centuries that followed, whole villages were abandoned with their citizens settling elsewhere within the empire.  Jerusalem was renamed Aelia and Judea took on the name of Palestine (in honor of the Philistines - a final insult to the people of David).

Christianity

In their new homes, the Jews faced a challenge just as daunting as the Romans.  This time the threat came from within - a new form of Judaism called Christianity.  These Christians did not mourn the loss of the temple and its sacrificial ordinances like the Jews did.  They believed that God had decided to sacrifice His Only Son once and for all making animal sacrifices obsolete.

Constantine

In 320 AD, civil war had broken out in the Roman Empire and the victorious Constantine had received a revelation to bind the empire back together under the sign of the cross.  Unfortunately for Judaism, the Christian bishops who most influenced Constantine happened to be the ones most hostile to the Jews.  These bishops wanted to stamp out any friendship that other bishops felt towards Judaism.  John Chrysostom, one of the great preachers of the 4th Century, was enraged when some in his congregation would slip out during church services to attend the more interesting Jewish High Holy Days festivals.  He preached eight sermons against the Judeaizers in which he first coined the term Christ killers.  With laws being passed against them, the Jews started looking for new homes in North Africa, Spain and Russia.

The Shepherd Akiva

This spreading out of the Jewish nation threatened Judaism with disintegration.  The laws, rituals and customs of the religion had never been written down.  In the 2nd century AD, an illiterate 40-year-old shepherd named Akiva taught himself how to read and began to study the Hebrew Bible.  Within a few years he became a leading sage and learned there was a vast storehouse of oral traditions from Hillel to Yochanan ben Zakai in addition to the written word. He started to organize and write these oral traditions down.  Being a strong supporter of rebellion, he was arrested by the Romans who then flayed him alive as an example to other rebels.

The Talmud

Akiva's heirs continued with his work and formed the Talmud, which is a set of ethical commandments meant to complement the ritual commandments set forth in the Hebrew Bible.  It's a how-to book for practicing the religion.  With the Talmud, Jewish tradition could thrive in spite of the discrimination it faced.

Gifts

Invariably, the Christians and Muslims who lived among the Jews discovered they had unique gifts.  One of the skills they introduced to country after country was glass blowing, played by Stuart Abelman.  Other gifts included advanced knowledge of medicine and their strong desire to give every child an education.

Undoubtedly, according to the documentary, their most important gift to us is monotheism and the written Word of God as expressed in their Bible, which became the Christian Old Testament.

References

Ancient Israel and Judah
2003 American television series debuts
2000s American documentary television series